Group B of the 1993 Federation Cup Asia/Oceania Zone was one of three pools in the Asia/Oceania zone of the 1993 Federation Cup. Three teams competed in a round robin competition, with the top two teams advancing to the play-offs.

Chinese Taipei vs. Singapore

China vs. Chinese Taipei

China vs. Singapore

See also
Fed Cup structure

References

External links
 Fed Cup website

1993 Federation Cup Asia/Oceania Zone